Jackie Barnett Presents Hello Young Lovers is a 1965 album by Jimmy Durante, with arrangements by Roy Bargy. Hello Young Lovers''' was the last recording that Durante and Bargy would make together; Bargy had served as Durante's musical director since 1943.

The cover photography for the album was taken at the home of Wilbur Clark, the owner of the Desert Inn nightclub in Las Vegas.

"Smile" featured in the film, and trailer for, Joker'' (2019).

Track listing

Personnel
Jimmy Durante – vocals
The John Rarig Singers
Roy Bargy – arranger, conductor
Jimmy Hilliard – producer

References

Bibliography

External links
 

1965 albums
Albums arranged by Roy Bargy
Albums conducted by Roy Bargy
Warner Records albums
Jimmy Durante albums